is a Japanese television personality, YouTuber and former professional baseball player. He played in Japan's Nippon Professional Baseball league for 23 seasons. He retired following the 2008 season.

Born in Kishiwada, Osaka in 1967, his family were baseball fans. He began his career when he joined his high school baseball team in the 1980s that subsequently won two Japanese High School Baseball Championships. He became a widely respected high school player and was selected by Seibu Lions in 1985. During his time in Lions, the team won six Japan Series titles and he tied the rookie HR record for Japanese professional baseball. In 1996, he joined the Yomiuri Giants, and was an integral part of their 2000 and 2002 Japan Series championship squads. He later joined the Orix Buffaloes, before retiring in 2008. He has been dubbed "The Uncrowned King" as he never won a major batting title, despite being widely regarded as one of NPB's greatest hitters.

In 2014, Kiyohara was hospitalized after an alleged illegal drug abuse. At first he denied the allegation, after which he was divorced by his wife Aki Kimura due to domestic violence. After a lengthy investigation, in 2016, Kiyohara tested positive for stimulants and was subsequently arrested and given a suspended prison sentence.

After being cast out from television for his conviction, he became a YouTuber posting videos about baseball and weight loss.

Early life 
Kazuhiro Kiyohara was born on August 18, 1967 in Kishiwada, Osaka. His family owned an electronics store called Toshiba Store.

His father was a Hanshin Tigers fan while the rest of his family were fans of the Yomiuri Giants. Influenced by this, Kiyohara was a Yomiuri Giants fan growing up.

In 1974, he entered Yagi Minami Elementary School and began playing baseball joining the Kishiwada Little League. In third grade of elementary, he already stood at 155 cm (5 ft 1 in), and recorded 70 km/h (43 mph) in long throw during his entrance test to the league.

In 1977, the fourth grader Kiyohara joined a team of sixth graders and became the only regular of his age. He also displayed his talent as a pitcher.

Career
Kazuhiro Kiyohara became a household name in Japan as a home run hitter for the Osaka PL Gakuen high school baseball team in the mid-1980s. His team won two Japanese High School Baseball Championships, finished second twice, and was fourth on one occasion. (There are spring and summer national high school baseball tournaments annually in Japan, held at the famous Koshien Stadium.)

Kiyohara was one part of a dominant duo on his high school team with his teammate, pitcher Masumi Kuwata. They became known in the popular vernacular of the time as the "K-K Combi", which stood for the Kiyohara and Kuwata combination. They were widely respected as high school players, and their individual and team accomplishments became memorable parts of the history of schoolboy baseball in Japan.

Kiyohara was selected by the Seibu Lions with their first pick of the 1985 draft. This was reportedly a huge disappointment for him because the Yomiuri Giants, the most popular NPB team of the day, had promised to choose him in the draft. However, the Giants decided to take Masumi Kuwata with their initial pick in '85, instead of Kiyohara, which made for great theater in the Japanese mass media at the time.

His rookie season with the Seibu Lions produced a .304 average with 31 home runs and 78 RBIs. He tied the rookie HR record for Japanese professional baseball, and all three previously mentioned statistics were the best totals for a rookie in his first professional season out of high school. He became a top cleanup hitter for the Lions in his eleven seasons with the club, accumulating 332 HRs and 915 RBIs. During his time in a Lions uniform, the team won six Japan Series titles.

Kiyohara qualified for free agency after the 1996 season and signed with the Yomiuri Giants, fulfilling a childhood dream. With the Giants, Kiyohara had some outstanding seasons playing alongside many star players, including future major leaguer Hideki Matsui. Kiyohara suited up for the Giants through the 2005 season (one in which he collected his 500th home run and 2,000th  hit), and was an integral part of their 2000 and 2002 Japan Series championship squads.

In 1997, Kiyohara ranked 5th in the annual competition television program Pro Sportsman No.1 aired on TBS.

An aging Kiyohara moved from the Giants to the Orix Buffaloes for the final three seasons of his career, calling it quits at the end of the 2008 campaign. He appeared in only 89 games for the Buffaloes, citing various physical ailments for his inactivity.

Despite his many accomplishments, Kiyohara could not escape heavy criticism during the final ten seasons of his career due to a long list of injuries that forced him to miss considerable chunks of almost every season. From 1999–2008, he played in 100 or more games only twice (2001 and 2003), while being paid the equivalent of multimillion-dollar salaries each year.

Kiyohara is often referred as "The Uncrowned King" because he never won a major batting title, even though he was one of NPB's greatest hitters. He surpassed 2,000 hits, 500 home runs, and 1,500 RBIs, which has been accomplished by only five other legendary players (Sadaharu Oh, Katsuya Nomura, Hiromitsu Kadota, Isao Harimoto and Hiromitsu Ochiai).

Legal issues

Illegal drug possession

Illegal drug abuse and hospitalization 
On March 6, 2014, Bunshun reported that Kiyohara had an emergency hospitalization to treat side effects caused by illegal drug abuse. The report also included a statement by his wife that Kiyohara had chased her with a knife.

However, the next week, Kiyohara gave a statement on Friday denying the drug abuse allegation and that his treatment was due to type 2 diabetes. He also stated that he was going to file a civil lawsuit against Bunshun, but ultimately he never filed a complaint. Bunshun also published that Kiyohara had taken a large dragon tattoo that spanned from his right leg and left chest to his back.

Domestic violence and divorce 
Following the publication of Kiyohara's illegal drug abuse, his wife Aki and a resident of the same building Chisako Takashima testified about Kiyohara's history of domestic violence on Shūkan Bunshun. According to their testimony, Kiyohara had had a series of furious outbursts on his wife, including one incident where Kiyohara had chased her with a knife. According to Takashima, she had heard loud noises from the Kiyohara residence starting at 5 AM and thought that "the house was going to fall apart." Furthermore, Bunshun reported that Kiyohara had threatened their journalist and published photos of him assaulting the journalist. It was noted that what made Kiyohara's violent outbursts particularly scary was the fact that he is a large man standing at 190 cm (6 ft 3 in) and weighing over 100 kg (220 lb).

After these incidents, his wife Aki and the couple's two sons moved away from Kiyohara's house. The two divorced in August 2014, and custody of the two sons was given to Aki Kimura.

Arrest and investigation 
On February 2, 2016, Kiyohara was arrested for the possession of illegal drugs. The Tokyo Metropolitan Police had been investigating him for over a year. On 23 February, Kiyohara was arrested after a urinalysis tested positive for stimulants. He was convicted and given a suspended prison sentence.

YouTube channel 
Ostracized by Japanese television because of his conviction on illegal drug possession, Kiyohara started a YouTube channel, Kiyochan Sports, in December 2020. Among the video topics, he talks about baseball and losing weight; the channel had more than 320,000 subscribers in March 2021.

Career statistics

Statistics current as of January 13, 2014

Career record
.272 Batting average
2,118 Hits (22nd)
525 Home runs (5th)
1,530 RBIs (6th)
1,280 Runs (9th)
1,346 Ball on bases (3rd)
1,955 Strikeouts (1st)
196 Hit by pitch (1st)

Trivia
He holds the national record of 20 walk-off hits, 12 walk-off home runs, and 2 walk-off grand slam home runs.
 Koshien Baseball tournament records:
National High School Baseball Championship (Summer Koshien)
5 home runs in single tournament (1985)
3 home runs in single game (1984)
Home runs in consecutive games (3 games) (1985)
National High School Baseball Invitational Tournament (Spring Koshien)
3 home runs in single tournament (1984)
2 home runs in single game (1984)
Total home runs in Koshien Baseball tournaments
13 home runs (1983–1985)

See also 
 List of top Nippon Professional Baseball home run hitters

References

External links

1967 births
Living people
Japanese baseball players
Orix Buffaloes players
Baseball people from Osaka Prefecture
People from Kishiwada, Osaka
Seibu Lions players
Yomiuri Giants players
Nippon Professional Baseball Rookie of the Year Award winners
Japanese people convicted of drug offenses